ER degradation-enhancing alpha-mannosidase-like 3 is an enzyme that in humans is encoded by the EDEM3 gene.

References

Further reading